Paul LeClerc is a scholar in French literature, former President of Hunter College, and former President and CEO of the New York Public Library. LeClerc is also a trustee of the Andrew W. Mellon Foundation as Director of the National Book Foundation, as Director of the Maison Française of Columbia University.

Early life 
LeClerc was born in Lebanon, New Hampshire. LeClerc's grandparents were French Canadian immigrants. In 1959, LeClerc graduated from Holy Cross High School in Flushing, New York.

Education 
LeClerc earned a B.A. from the College of the Holy Cross. LeClerc earned a Ph.D. in French literature from Columbia University.

Career 
In 1988, LeClerc became the President of Hunter College in New York City, New York.

LeClerc served as president of the New York Public Library from December 1, 1993 until July 1, 2011. 

LeClerc was elected to the American Philosophical Society in 2006. 

In 2012, LeClerc became the director of Columbia Global Centers (Paris) for   
Columbia University. LeClerc is the chairman of Maison Française Advisory Board.

Personal life 
LeClerc's wife is Judith Ginsberg.

See also 
 Voltaire

References

External links 
 Paul LeClerc at c-span.org
 Paul LeClerc at Columbia University

College of the Holy Cross alumni
Living people
Holy Cross High School (Flushing) alumni
Columbia Graduate School of Arts and Sciences alumni
University of Paris alumni
Union College (New York) faculty
Presidents of Hunter College
Year of birth missing (living people)
Presidents of the New York Public Library
People from Lebanon, New Hampshire
Members of the American Philosophical Society